Kerend Rural District or Korond Rural District may refer to:
  Kerend Rural District (Golestan Province)
  Korond Rural District (Boshruyeh County), South Khorasan province